The R372 road is a short regional road in Ireland, located in southern County Galway.

References

Regional roads in the Republic of Ireland
Roads in County Galway